The Huff Jones House is located in Oconto, Wisconsin. It was listed on the National Register of Historic Places in 1978 and on the State Register of Historic Places in 1989.

References

Houses on the National Register of Historic Places in Wisconsin
National Register of Historic Places in Oconto County, Wisconsin
Houses in Oconto County, Wisconsin
Greek Revival architecture in Wisconsin
Houses completed in 1857